Loha is a 1987 Indian Hindi-language action thriller film directed by Raj N. Sippy. It features an ensemble cast of Dharmendra, Shatrughan Sinha, Karan Kapoor, Madhavi, Mandakini, Kader Khan and Amrish Puri. The film centres around a plot involving three men (Dharmendra, Sinha and Kapoor) who set out to save 25 hostages from a dreaded bandit (Puri) who is on the payroll of the local politician (Khan).

Loha released worldwide on 23rd January 1987, coinciding with the Indian Republic Day weekend. The film received mainly positive reviews from critics and was a commercial success. It was the first hit for Dharmendra in the year 1987, and it the same year he would go on to give 6 more hits.

Story
Honest and diligent Police Inspector Amar (Dharmendra) is a middle-class man living in Bombay. In his attempt to arrest bandit Sher Singh (Amrish Puri), he and Inspector Dayal (Raza Murad) are attacked. Amar survives, but Dayal gets his legs crushed under a truck and is, as a result, unable to walk without a wheelchair. Subsequently, Amar arrests local politician Jagannath Prasad (Kader Khan), who gets released without being charged while Amar gets reprimanded, and decides to resign. Shortly thereafter, Sher Singh hijacks a bus and holds the passengers as hostages in exchange for 25 of his jailed associates. Dayal's granddaughter, Seema (Mandakini), is amongst them, and Dayal asks Amar for assistance. Amar, along with ex-convict, Qasim Ali (Shatrughan Sinha), and Karan (Karan Kapoor), a drug-dealer, manage to rescue them, but differences crop up among the trio and they part ways. Then Amar finds out that Qasim and Karan have masterminded a plan to facilitate the escape of the 25 convicts, and decides to confront them.

Cast
Dharmendra as Senior Police Inspector Amar
Shatrughan Sinha as Qasim Ali Barkat Ali Jung Shamsher Bahadur
Amrish Puri as Sher "Shera" Singh
Karan Kapoor as Karan
Vikas Anand as Senior Police Inspector
Jugal Hansraj as Hassan Ali
Goga Kapoor as Kundan Singh
Kader Khan as Jagannath Prasad
Praveen Kumar as Shera's Man in prison
Roopesh Kumar as Shera's Man in prison
Madhavi as Anita
Mandakini as Seema
Mac Mohan as Shera's Man in prison
Ram Mohan as Rahim Chacha
Moolchand as Man with a briefcase
Raza Murad as Dayal
Yunus Parvez as Shera's Man in prison
Jagdish Raj as Police Commissioner
Tej Sapru as Bhima
Joginder as Shera's Man in prison
Anjan Srivastav as Champaklal
Sudhir as Shera's Man in prison
Bhushan Tiwari as Shera's Man in prison
Shashi Kiran as Dang
Ramesh Goyal as Shera's Man in prison

Soundtrack
Farooq Kaiser wrote the lyrics. 

"Tu Ladki Number One Hai" - Alka Yagnik, Shabbir Kumar
"Teri Hasti Hai Kya Jo Mitayega" - Anuradha Paudwal, Kavita Krishnamurthy, Shabbir Kumar
"Patli Kamar Lambe Baal" - Anuradha Paudwal, Kavita Krishnamurthy
"Saat Taalon Mein Rakh, Saat Pardo Me Rakh" - Kavita Krishnamurthy, Anuradha Paudwal
"Hum Gharibo Ne Tera" - Shailendra Singh, Suresh Wadkar, Mohammed Aziz

External links

References

1987 films
1980s Hindi-language films
Indian action films
1987 action films
Films scored by Laxmikant–Pyarelal
Films directed by Raj N. Sippy